Man Running is a Canadian drama film, directed by Gary Burns and released in 2018. The film stars Gord Rand as Jim, a medical doctor running a mountain marathon while wrestling with the ethical complications of assisted suicide after an ill teenage girl (Milli Wilkinson) asks for his help ending her life.

Production on the film commenced in 2017, with the film being shot in Calgary, Canmore and Kananaskis, Alberta.

The film premiered in September 2018 at the Cinéfest Sudbury International Film Festival, and had its second screening at the Calgary International Film Festival a week later. The film received several Rosie Award nominations from the Alberta Media Production Industries Association in 2019, including for Best Picture.

The film had its television premiere on August 17, 2019, on CBC Television.

References

External links
 

2018 films
2010s sports drama films
Canadian sports drama films
English-language Canadian films
Films directed by Gary Burns
Films shot in Alberta
2018 drama films
2010s English-language films
2010s Canadian films